Un Año is a song by Colombian singer Sebastián Yatra with Mexican pop rock Reik, it was released on January 19, 2019.

Background
"Un Año" was released on January 19, 2019. the song was written by Sebastian Yatra, Andrés Torres, Mauricio Rengifo and his producer Dandee.

Cover versions
On June 6, 2021, Filipino boy group BGYO performed a cover of "Un Año" on their virtual international fan meet.

Commercial performance
In United States, "Un Año" begin at number 37 on the Hot Latin Songs and peaked on the number 12 on April 20, 2020. It also peaked number four on Latin Pop Airplay and topped both Latin Airplay

In Spain, the song peaked the number six on February 24, 2020.

In other countries, the song topped the charts in Ecuador and reached the top 10 in Argentina and Mexico, it has also reached the top 20 in Colombia.

Charts

Weekly charts

Year-end charts

Certifications

References

2019 singles
2019 songs
Spanish-language songs
Songs written by Andrés Torres (producer)
Song recordings produced by Andrés Torres (producer)
Sebastián Yatra songs
Songs written by Sebastián Yatra
Songs written by Mauricio Rengifo